Cadex Defence is a Canadian firearms manufacturer based in Saint-Jean-sur-Richelieu, Quebec. It produces high-end bolt action rifles, precision sniper rifles, rifle chassis and defence accessories.

History
The company was founded in 1994 as Cadex. Initially it was specialising in helmet and eyewear testing equipment. In 2000, after it secured a number of orders from military units and police departments, it created the defence division. 

Cadex Defence worked with Remington Arms to create the Remington RACS chassis for the M2010 Enhanced Sniper Rifle, a modern revision of Remington Model 700 rifle. The company offers a similar chassis to Remington RACS under the name Cadex Dual Strike.

On May 8, 2019, a 2 million CAD contract was awarded to Cadex Inc. to deliver 300 monocular night-vision devices for the Canadian Army Reserves.

Products
Cadex Defence produces CDX-MC Kraken multi-caliber rifle, which is based on Cadex Dual Strike chassis.

The company also produces CDX-40 Shadow rifles. Since 2019, these rifles are used by long-range snipers of the French special forces unit 1st RPIMA. The rifles use .408 Chey Tac chamber.

Cadex Defence rifles typically use barrels from the American company Bartlein Barrels. Apart from that, their gear is entirely Canadian-made.

See also 
 Accuracy International

References

External links 
 Official website

Defence companies of Canada
Firearm manufacturers of Canada
Manufacturing companies based in Quebec
Manufacturing companies established in 1994